La Licorne or Cahiers de La Licorne/Cuadernos de la Licorne was a literary magazine founded by Uruguayan poet Susana Soca, which produced three issues in Paris in Spring 1947, Autumn 1948, and Winter 1948.

A follow-on publication, Entregas de la licorne, was launched in Montevideo in 1953 under editor Ángel Rama.

References

1947 establishments in France
1948 disestablishments in France
Defunct literary magazines published in France
French-language magazines
Magazines established in 1947
Magazines disestablished in 1948
Magazines published in Paris